Fleming County is a county located in the U.S. state of Kentucky. As of the 2020 census, the population was 15,082.  Its county seat is Flemingsburg. The county was formed in 1798 and named for Colonel John Fleming, an Indian fighter and early settler. It is a moist county.
In 1998, the Kentucky General Assembly designated Fleming County as the Covered Bridge Capital of Kentucky.

History
Fleming County was established in 1798 from land given by Mason County. The first courthouse, possibly built of logs, was replaced in 1830 and again in 1952.

Geography

Adjacent counties
 Mason County  (north)
 Lewis County  (northeast)
 Rowan County  (southeast)
 Bath County  (south)
 Nicholas County  (west)
 Robertson County  (northwest)

Demographics

As of the census of 2000, there were 13,792 people, 5,367 households, and 3,966 families residing in the county.  The population density was 39 people per square mile (15/km2).  There were 6,120 housing units at an average density of 17 per square mile (7/km2).  The racial makeup of the county was 97.33% White, 1.41% Black or African American, 0.14% Native American, 0.17% Asian, 0.28% from other races, and 0.67% from two or more races.  0.75% of the population were Hispanic or Latino of any race.

There were 5,367 households, out of which 34.80% had children under the age of 18 living with them, 60.30% were married couples living together, 9.60% had a female householder with no husband present, and 26.10% were non-families. 23.30% of all households were made up of individuals, and 11.00% had someone living alone who was 65 years of age or older.  The average household size was 2.55 and the average family size was 2.99.

In the county, the population was spread out, with 25.40% under the age of 18, 8.40% from 18 to 24, 29.00% from 25 to 44, 23.90% from 45 to 64, and 13.40% who were 65 years of age or older.  The median age was 36 years. For every 100 females there were 96.00 males.  For every 100 females age 18 and over, there were 93.20 males.

The median income for a household in the county was $27,990, and the median income for a family was $33,300. Males had a median income of $26,463 versus $19,895 for females. The per capita income for the county was $14,214.  About 14.80% of families and 18.60% of the population were below the poverty line, including 24.90% of those under age 18 and 20.10% of those age 65 or over.

Politics

Communities

Cities
 Ewing
 Flemingsburg

Census-designated place
 Elizaville

Unincorporated communities

 Bald Hill
 Beechburg
 Blue Bank
 Colfax
 Concord
 Cowan
 Craintown
 Dalesburg
 Fairview
 Foxport
 Fox Valley
 Goddard
 Grange City
 Hillsboro
 Hilltop
 Johnson Junction
 Mount Carmel
 Muses Mills
 Nepton
 Pleasureville
 Plummers Landing
 Poplar Grove
 Poplar Plains
 Ringos Mills
 Sherburne
 Tilton
 Wallingford

Notable residents
 Herman Chittison, jazz pianist
 Edward Alvin Clary, US Navy Medal Of Honor Recipient, March 23, 1910
 Willis A. Gorman, Union Army general during the American Civil War, member of U.S. House of Representatives for Indiana, and territorial governor of Minnesota
 Claiborne Fox Jackson, Pro-Confederate Missouri governor during the early part of the Civil War
 Alvin Saunders, United States senator from Nebraska
 Franklin Sousley, Iwo Jima flagraiser

See also

 Moist county
 National Register of Historic Places listings in Fleming County, Kentucky

References

External links
 The Kentucky Highlands Project
 Welcome to Fleming County

 
Kentucky counties
Counties of Appalachia
1798 establishments in Kentucky
Populated places established in 1798